Will Scott Magnay (born 10 June 1998) is an Australian professional basketball player for Obradoiro CAB of the Liga ACB. He is also contracted with the Tasmania JackJumpers of the National Basketball League (NBL). He played one season of college basketball for the Tulsa Golden Hurricane.

Early life
Magnay was born in Brisbane, Queensland. He attended Nudgee College and the Australian Institute of Sport. He played in the SEABL for the BA Centre of Excellence in 2016.

College career
Magnay played college basketball for the Tulsa Golden Hurricane during the 2016–17 season. He averaged 3.9 points and 3 rebounds in 32 games played.

Professional career

Brisbane Bullets and QBL (2017–2020)
In October 2017, Magnay left the Tulsa Golden Hurricane program and signed a three-year deal with his hometown team, the Brisbane Bullets. He spent the 2017–18 NBL season as a development player. Following his first season, he played for the Southern Districts Spartans during the 2018 QBL season.

For the 2018–19 NBL season, Magnay was elevated to a fully-rostered player. In 2019, he helped the Brisbane Capitals win the QBL championship.

Magnay had a breakout year during the 2019–20 NBL season that saw him enter the Bullets' starting line-up and receive attention from National Basketball Association (NBA) scouts. He was named the NBL Most Improved Player in 2020. Magnay re-signed with the Bullets for a two-year contract on 19 February 2020.

New Orleans Pelicans (2020–2021)
On 2 December 2020, Magnay signed a two-way contract with the New Orleans Pelicans of the National Basketball Association (NBA) and their NBA G League affiliate, the Erie BayHawks. He played 10 games for the BayHawks in February 2021 during the G League hub season. He made his NBA debut on 23 March 2021 against the Los Angeles Lakers, going scoreless over the final three minutes of the game. On 12 April 2021, he was waived by the Pelicans.

Perth Wildcats (2021)
On 6 May 2021, Magnay signed with the Perth Wildcats for the rest of the 2020–21 NBL season. He averaged 4.7 points, 2.9 rebounds and 1.7 assists per game in 15 games played with the Wildcats.

Tasmania JackJumpers and Obradoiro CAB (2021–present)
On 12 July 2021, Magnay signed a one-year deal with the Tasmania JackJumpers, a new club entering the NBL for the first time in 2021–22. He was limited to 11 games in 2021–22 due to a knee injury. He subsequently re-signed with the JackJumpers on a two-year deal on 21 April 2022.

Following the 2022–23 NBL season, Magnay moved to Spain to play for Obradoiro CAB of the Liga ACB.

Career statistics

NBA

Regular season

|-
| style="text-align:left;"| 
| style="text-align:left;"| New Orleans
| 1 || 0 || 3.0 || .000 || .000 || – || .0 || .0 || .0 || .0 || .0
|- class="sortbottom"
| style="text-align:center;" colspan="2"| Career
| 1 || 0 || 3.0 || .000 || .000 || – || .0 || .0 || .0 || .0 || .0

College

|-
| style="text-align:left;"| 2016–17
| style="text-align:left;"| Tulsa
| 32 || 12 || 14.0 || .578 || .000 || .571 || 3.0 || 0.3 || 0.1 || 0.9 || 3.9
|-

References

External links
NBL profile

1998 births
Living people
Australian expatriate basketball people in the United States
Australian men's basketball players
Basketball players from Brisbane
Brisbane Bullets players
Centers (basketball)
Erie BayHawks (2019–2021) players
Medalists at the 2019 Summer Universiade
National Basketball Association players from Australia
New Orleans Pelicans players
Perth Wildcats players
Power forwards (basketball)
Tasmania JackJumpers players
Tulsa Golden Hurricane men's basketball players
Undrafted National Basketball Association players
Universiade medalists in basketball
Universiade bronze medalists for Australia